Raj Kumari Pandey (born 13 December 1969) is a Nepalese long-distance runner. She competed in the women's marathon at the 1988 Summer Olympics.

References

External links
 

1969 births
Living people
Athletes (track and field) at the 1988 Summer Olympics
Nepalese female long-distance runners
Nepalese female marathon runners
Olympic athletes of Nepal
Place of birth missing (living people)
20th-century Nepalese women